Anna Elizabeth Burke  (born 1 January 1966) is a former Australian politician and current Member of the Administrative Appeals Tribunal. She was a member of the Australian House of Representatives from October 1998 to May 2016, representing the Division of Chisholm, Victoria. From October 2012 to August 2013, she was Speaker of the Australian House of Representatives.

Early life
Burke was born in Melbourne and educated at Presentation College, Windsor. She graduated from Monash University in 1988 with a Bachelor of Arts degree with Honours in English Literature, and later from the University of Melbourne in 1994 with a Master of Commerce with Honours in Industrial Relations and Human Resource Management.

Before entering politics, Burke worked as a trade union official and human resources manager. In this capacity, she worked for Victoria Roads from 1988 to 1993 and for Victoria University (then the Victorian Institute of Technology) from 1993 to 1994. In 1994, she joined the Finance Sector Union as their National Industrial Officer.

Politics

Early years
She had joined the Ashwood branch of the Labor Party in 1986, and in 1997 she was pre-selected for the Division of Chisholm by the Labor Party. The division was then held by Liberal Minister for Health and Family Services Michael Wooldridge. She was not expected to win, but after Wooldridge switched seats she won the seat at the 1998 federal election against Peter Vlahos of the Liberal Party.

Role as Deputy Speaker and Speaker
After Labor's win at the 2007 federal election, Burke was elected as Deputy Speaker of the House of Representatives.

She successfully defended her seat in the 2010 federal election.

On 24 November 2011, she was nominated by the Opposition for the position of Speaker of the House, which she declined. However, she accepted the Government's nomination for the position of Deputy Speaker on the same day, and was elected to that position following a ballot.

On 22 April 2012 the Speaker, Peter Slipper, announced he was standing aside, meaning he would remain Speaker but would not attend sessions of the House, until fraud allegations made against him with respect to travel expenses were resolved. The Opposition called for Slipper to stay away from the chamber until sexual harassment charges were resolved as well. As Deputy Speaker, Burke was deprived of her deliberative vote, being able only to vote in the case of a tie. On 9 October 2012, Peter Slipper resigned as Speaker of the House. Later that evening, Burke was nominated and elected the new Speaker of the House of Representatives unopposed.

Her tenure as Speaker ended when her party lost government in 2013. She then sought to become chief opposition whip but was not successful.

Retirement from politics
On 16 December 2015, Burke announced that she would not re-contest her seat at the 2016 federal election.  She was replaced as the Member for Chisholm by Liberal Julia Banks, who was the only Coalition candidate to win a seat held by an opposition party in 2016.

On 16 January 2017, Burke was appointed as a full-time Member of the General, Freedom of Information, and Veterans' Appeals Divisions of the Administrative Appeals Tribunal, with her term to end on 15 January 2024.

In the 2019 Australia Day Honours Burke was made an Officer of the Order of Australia for "distinguished service to the Parliament of Australia, particularly as Speaker of the House of Representatives, and to the community".

References

External links
 Personal website
 
 Summary of parliamentary voting for Anna Burke MP on TheyVoteForYou.org.au
 

1966 births
Living people
Speakers of the Australian House of Representatives
Australian Labor Party members of the Parliament of Australia
Labor Right politicians
Members of the Australian House of Representatives
Members of the Australian House of Representatives for Chisholm
University of Melbourne alumni
Monash University alumni
Women members of the Australian House of Representatives
21st-century Australian politicians
21st-century Australian women politicians
20th-century Australian politicians
Women legislative speakers
University of Melbourne women
Officers of the Order of Australia
20th-century Australian women politicians